Oder-Spree is a Kreis (district) in the eastern part of Brandenburg, Germany. Neighboring are (from north clockwise) the district Märkisch-Oderland, the district-free city Frankfurt (Oder), Poland, the districts Spree-Neiße and Dahme-Spreewald, and the Bundesland Berlin.

Geography
The district is named after the two major rivers in the district - the Spree river forms a large bend within the district; the Oder river constitutes the eastern border.

History
The district was created in 1993 by merging the districts Eisenhüttenstadt, Beeskow and Fürstenwalde, and the district-free city Eisenhüttenstadt.

Demography

Coat of arms

The coat of arms shows symbols for the three former districts which make up the district. In the top left quarter is the coat of arms of the Bishops of Lebus, who had their seat in Fürstenwalde. The second quarter shows the checkered bar of the Cistercian Order as the symbol of the Abbey of Neuzelle, who until 1817 owned most of the territory which later became the district Eisenhüttenstadt. The two quarters in the bottom symbolize the former district Beeskow. The three knives in the left are the symbol of the Lords of Strehla, the deer antler the symbol of the Lords of Biberstein, who in 1317 succeeded the Lords of Strehla as the Lords of Beeskow and Storkow.

Towns and municipalities

The capital of the district is Beeskow, but Fürstenwalde is the biggest town, with a population of 31,000 people.

References

External links

 Official website (German)
 Website Beeskow (German)
 Website Eisenhüttenstadt (German)
 Website Fürstenwalde (German)
 Website Schöneiche (English)